Recently the number of species within the Arceuthobium has been reduced from 42 to 26.  The structure of the subgenera and sections follows Nickrent et al. (2004) who resolved the phylogeny of the genus using nuclear ribosomal internal transcribed spacer (ITS) sequences and chloroplast trnT-L-F sequences.

Much of the work in Arceuthobium systematics was undertaken and compiled by Hawksworth and Wiens

Subgenus Arceuthobium

Section Arceuthobium
 Arceuthobium juniperi-procerae Chiovenda (Parasite of Juniperus)
 Arceuthobium oxycedri (DC) Bieb. (Parasite of Juniperus)
 Arceuthobium tibetense H.S. Kiu & W. Ren (Parasite of Abies forrestii)

Section Chinense Nickrent
 Arceuthobium chinense Lecomte
 Arceuthobium minutissimum J.D: Hooker
 Arceuthobium sicuanense (H.S. Kiu) D. Hawksw. & Wiens
 Arceuthobium pini D. Hawksw. & Wiens

Section Azorica
 Arceuthobium azoricum  (Parasite of Juniperus brevifolia)

Subgenus Vaginata

Section Americana Nickrent
 Arceuthobium abietis-religiosae Hiel
 Arceuthobium americanum Nutt. Ex Engelm.  (Parasite of Pinus banksiana, P. contorta var. latifolia and P. contorta var. murrayana)
 Arceuthobium verticilliflorum Engelm. (The only species lacking explosive seed dehiscence)

Section Penda Nickrent
 Arceuthobium guatemalense D. Hawksw. & Wiens  (Parasite of Pinus ayacahuite.  Also the most endangered Arceuthobium due to extensive logging in Guatemala)
 Arceuthobium pendens D. Hawksw. & Wiens  (Parasite of piñyon pines)

Section Globosa Nickrent
 Arceuthobium globosum D. Hawksw. & Wiens including: A. globosum subsp. grandicaule D. Hawksw. & Wiens, A. aureum D. Hawksw. & Wiens subsp. aureum, A. aureum subsp. petersonii D. Hawksw. & Wiens

Section Pusilla Nickrent
 Arceuthobium bicarinatum Urban.
 Arceuthobium pusillum Peck.

Section Rubra D. Hawksw. & Wiens
 Arceuthobium gillii D. Hawksw. & Wiens including: A. nigrum D. Hawksw. & Wiens
 Arceuthobium rubrum D. Hawksw. & Wiens including: A. oaxacanum D. Hawksw. & Wiens
 Arceuthobium yecorense D. Hawksw. & Wiens
Section Vaginata D. Hawksw. & Wiens
This section has the broadest range of host species, parasitizing 20 species of Pinus.
 Arceuthobium hondurense D. Hawksw. & Wiens including: A. hawksworthii Wiens & Shaw
 Arceuthobium strictum D. Hawksw. & Wiens
 Arceuthobium vaginatum (Willd.) Presl. including: A. vaginatum subsp. cryptopodum (Engelm.) D. Hawksw. & Wiens, A. durangense (Engelm.) D. Hawksw. & Wiens
Section Minuta D. Hawksw. & Wiens
 Arceuthobium divaricatum Engelm.  (Parasite of piñyon pines)
 Arceuthobium douglasii Engelm.  (Parasite of Pseudotsuga menziesii, occasionally Abies grandis and Picea engelmannii)
Section Campylopoda D. Hawksw. & Wiens
 Arceuthobium blumeri A. Nelson
 Arceuthobium campylopodumEngelm. including: Arceuthobium abietinum D. Hawksw. & Wiens, Arceuthobium apachecum D. Hawksw. & Wiens, A. californicum D. Hawksw. & Wiens, A. cyanocarpum (A. Nelson ex Rydberg) Coulter & Nelson, A. laricis (Piper) St. John, Arceuthobium littorum D. Hawksw., Wiens & Nickrent, Arceuthobium microcarpum (Engelm.) Hawksworth & Wiens, Arceuthobium monticola D. Hawksw., Wiens & Nickrent, A. occidentale Engelm., Arceuthobium siskiyouense D. Hawksw., Wiens & Nickrent, A. tsugense (Rosendahl) G.N. Jones  (Parasite hosts include Larix occidentalis, Tsuga mertensiana, T. heterophylla, Pinus contorta'', Abies grandis and Picea engelmannii)

References

 PLANTS profile for Arceuthobium (United States) including range maps.

Arceuthobium species
Arceuthobium